Stefan Čupić (born 7 May 1994) is a Serbian footballer who played as a goalkeeper.

Club career

OFK Beograd
Born in Niš, Čupić started playing football with local club Radnički, but moved to OFK Beograd in 2006. Čupić was promoted in the first team for the 2010–11 qualification, but stayed with youth team until summer 2012. He signed his first four-year professional contract with OFK Beograd ending of 2012, after he spent the first half of 2012–13 season as a loaned player with Serbian League Belgrade side Dorćol. Čupić made his professional SuperLiga debut for OFK Beograd on 6 April 2013, against Javor Ivanjica. At the beginning of 2014, Čupić was loaned to Dinamo Pančevo, but returned in OFK Beograd after a week and spent the whole season as a reserve choice. He also played in the last 2 fixtures of the 2013–14 season. For the first 2 seasons he spent with the first team, Čupić made 3 SuperLiga appearances at total, but was promoted as the first choice goalkeeper for the 2014–15 Serbian SuperLiga season taking jersey number 1. After 5 cleansheets on 15 games, he was elected for the best debutant in 2014. After Bogdan Planić's injury, coach Dejan Đurđević gave a captain armband to Čupić several fixtures before the end of season. Čupić also made 36 league and 3 cup matches for the 2015–16 season after which OFK Beograd relegated to the Serbian First League. Čupić also started new season with club, but missed opening matches and moved on six-month loan to OFK Bačka in last day of the summer transfer window 2016.

Sarpsborg 08 FF
On 20 January 2017, Čupić signed a two-year deal with Sarpsborg 08. While with the club, Čupić spent the whole 2017 Eliteserien campaign as a back-up choice for Anders Kristiansen. During the season, Čupić also appeared in the Norwegian Football Cup, making several appearances.

Voždovac
On 10 February 2018, Čupić returned to the Serbian SuperLiga side Voždovac, penning two-and-a-half year deal with the club. He chose to wear number 1 jersey after Zoran Popović left the club. Čupić made his debut for Voždovac in 3–2 victory over Napredak Kruševac on 23 February 2018.

FC Ararat-Armenia
On 16 January 2019, Čupić joined Armenian club FC Ararat-Armenia. On 27 January 2021, Ararat-Armenia confirmed that Čupić had left the club to join Olympiakos Nicosia for an undisclosed fee.

Olympiakos Nicosia
On 27 January 2021 he joined Olympiakos Nicosia. In the first six months at the club he had some good appearances but was mostly second goalkeeper. In the 2022 season he only made one appearance.

International career
Čupić was a member of U17 and U18 levels until 2012 when he joined Serbia national under-19 football team. During the 2013 UEFA European Under-19 Championship, Čupić was mostly used as a reserve for Predrag Rajković, and also played match France on 26 July 2016. After he won the championship, Čupić overgrown U19 selection and became a member of Serbia U21 in 2014. Coach of Serbia national under-23 football team, Milan Rastavac invited him to squad for a friendly match against Qatar in December 2015.

Career statistics

Club

Club 
Ararat-Armenia
 Armenian Premier League (2): 2018–19, 2019–20
 Armenian Supercup (1): 2019

International
Serbia U19
 UEFA European Under-19 Championship (1) : 2013

References

External links
 Stefan Čupić stats at utakmica.rs
 
 
 

1994 births
Living people
Sportspeople from Niš
Association football goalkeepers
Serbian footballers
Serbia youth international footballers
Serbia under-21 international footballers
OFK Beograd players
Olympiakos Nicosia players
FK Dorćol players
OFK Bačka players
FK Voždovac players
Sarpsborg 08 FF players
FC Ararat-Armenia players
Serbian SuperLiga players
Serbian First League players
Armenian Premier League players
Serbian expatriate footballers
Serbian expatriate sportspeople in Norway
Expatriate footballers in Norway
Expatriate footballers in Armenia